Certain Blacks is an album by the Art Ensemble of Chicago recorded in Paris on February 10, 1970, and released on the America label. It features performances by Lester Bowie, Joseph Jarman, Roscoe Mitchell (credited as Edward Mitchell Jr.), Malachi Favors Maghostut, Chicago Beau, Julio Finn and William A. Howell.

Reception
The Allmusic review by Ron Wynn states: "A classic, with spicy and frenetic solos one moment, comic overtones and clever melodies and rhythms the next. The Art Ensemble at this point were becoming stars overseas, and finding the going increasingly tougher in America. It's outside or avant-garde jazz with soul, heart, and funk".

Track listing 
 "Certain Blacks 'Do What They Wanna'" (Chicago Beau) - 23:41
 "One for Jarman" (Chicago Beau) - 7:07
 "Bye Bye Baby" (Sonny Boy Williamson) - 11:37
 Recorded February 10, 1970, in Paris

Personnel 
 Lester Bowie: trumpet
 Chicago Beau: tenor saxophone, piano, harmonica, percussion
 Joseph Jarman: alto saxophone, tenor saxophone, soprano saxophone, vibes, percussion
 Roscoe Mitchell: bass saxophone
 Julio Finn: harmonica
 Malachi Favors Maghostut: bass, percussion
 William A. Howell: drums

References 

1970 albums
America Records albums
Art Ensemble of Chicago albums